Volkmar Leimert (born 31 January 1940) is a German composer and dramaturg.

Life 
Born in  Berlin, Leimert besuchte bis zu seinem Abitur 1957 die EOS „Johann-Wolfgang-von-Goethe“ in Karl-Marx-Stadt. Privaten Musikunterricht erhielt er bei Gustav William Meyer in Grüna. Danach arbeitete er als Warenausgeber. Er studierte von 1959 bis 1964 musical composition bei Ottmar Gerster, Wilhelm Weismann and Carlernst Ortwein an der Leipziger Musikhochschule. Nach dem Staatsexamen war er von 1964 bis 1967 Aspirant in Leipzig. Im Anschluss wurde er Musikdramaturg an den Opernhaus Chemnitz (ab 1991 Chemnitz). 2005 ging er in den Ruhestand.

He is a member of the Lions Clubs International Chemnitz und im . Außerdem ist er Schriftführer des Ortsverbandes Chemnitz des International Association of Wagner Societies. 2008 wirkte Leimert an der gemeinsamen Projektausstellung Richard Wagner-Episode X des Bundes bildender Künstler Leipzig und Sächsischen Musikbundes im  mit.

Compositions 
 Passacaglia für großes Orchester, Pauken und Schlagzeug (1963)
 Sonate für Horn und Klavier (1964)
 Liedmotette „Die Sonne, die ist verblichen“ für 4/5-stimmigen gemischten Chor (1964)
 Streichquartett (1964)
 Drei Madrigale nach Texten von Johannes R. Becher für fünfstimmigen gemischten Chor a cappella (1965)
 Streichquartett II (1973)
 Pentagramm für Orchester (1974)
 Fünf Orchesterlieder after texts by Franz Fühmann for baritone and orchestra (1977)
 Konzert für Violoncello und Orchester (1980) – Auftragswerk des Theaters der Stadt Plauen zu den Robert-Schumann-Tagen des Bezirkes Karl-Marx-Stadt
 Goethe-Lieder für Bariton und Orchester (1982)
 Sextett für Flöte, Klarinette. Violine, Viola, Violoncello und Klavier (1982)
 Concertino für Flöte, Oboe und Streicher (1987)
 Marginalien zu Schumann (1987)

Publications 
 70 Jahre Opernhaus Karl-Marx-Stadt In Musik und Gesellschaft, 29, 1979, .
 44. Deutsches Mozartfest. 27.5.–4.6.95. Festschrift und Programm, Chemnitz 1995.
 Zur Chemnitzer Tannhäuser-Konzeption. In Udo Bermbach (ed.): Individuum versus Institution. Zur Urfassung von Richard Wagner's Tannhäuser (1845). Leipziger Univ.-Verlag, Leipzig 1996,  (Kulturelle Infrastruktur, vol. 7)
 Zum Libretto der Urfassung. In: Udo Bermbach (Hrsg.): Individuum versus Institution. Zur Urfassung von Richard Wagners „Tannhäuser“ (1845). Leipziger Univ.-Verlag, Leipzig 1996,  (Kulturelle Infrastruktur, volume 7)
 90 Jahre Opernhaus Chemnitz. 1909–1999. Städtisches Theater, Chemnitz 1999.
 100 Jahre Opernhaus Chemnitz. 18 Blätter zur Geschichte des Opernhauses. Städtisches Theater, Chemnitz 2009.

Filmography 
 1982:  (Musik und Drehbuch)

Further reading 
 Leimert, Volkmar. In Wilfried W. Bruchhäuser: Komponisten der Gegenwart im Deutschen Komponisten-Interessenverband. Ein Handbuch. 4th ediion. Deutscher Komponisten-Interessenverband, Berlin 1995, .

References

External links 
 Literatur von Volkmar Leimert in the Bibliography of Music Literature
 Volkmar Leimert in der MusicSack-Datenbank
 Volkmar Leimert

Dramaturges
20th-century classical composers
20th-century German composers
1940 births
Living people
Musicians from Berlin